Tang County or Tangxian is a county under the jurisdiction of Baoding prefecture-level city, in west-central Hebei province, People's Republic of China.

Administrative divisions
Towns:
Renhou, Wangjing, Gaochang, Beiluo, Baihe, Juncheng, Chuanli

Townships:
Changgucheng Township, Duting Township, Nandiantou Township, Beidiantou Township, Luozhuang Township, Baoshui Township, Dayang Township, Micheng Township, Qijiazhuang Township, Yangjiao Township, Shimen Township, Huangshikou Township, Daomaguan Township

Climate

External links

Geography of Baoding
County-level divisions of Hebei